The Independent Spirit Award for Best Cinematography is one of the annual awards given out by Film Independent, a non-profit organization dedicated to independent film and independent filmmakers. It was first given in 1985, with Japanese cinematographer Toyomichi Kurita being the first recipient of the award for his work in Trouble in Mind.

Winners and nominees

1980s

1990s

2000s

2010s

2020s

See also
 BAFTA Award for Best Cinematography
 Academy Award for Best Cinematography
 Critics' Choice Movie Award for Best Cinematography
 American Society of Cinematographers Award for Outstanding Achievement in Cinematography in Theatrical Releases

References

C
Awards for best cinematography
Awards established in 1985